Queen of the Universe is a drag queen singing competition television series produced by World of Wonder. The series is hosted by Graham Norton with the four judges coming from backgrounds in the worlds of music, drag, and reality TV competitions. The contestants competed for a cash prize of $250,000. The series premiered on Paramount+ on December 2, 2021. In February 2022, the series was renewed for a second season.

The winner of the first season was Grag Queen from Brazil, with Ada Vox from the U.S. finishing as the runner-up.

Production 
On February 24, 2021, Paramount Global and Paramount+ announced the international drag-singing competition Queen of the Universe from World of Wonder, the producers behind RuPaul’s Drag Race, with cast members to be named later. On September 27, 2021, it was announced that Graham Norton would be hosting the series. The judges were announced on October 28, 2021, as being Leona Lewis, Michelle Visage, Trixie Mattel and Vanessa Williams. The contestants for the first season were revealed on November 10, 2021. On February 15, 2022, it was announced that the series was renewed for a second season. In June 2022, it was announced that Mel B would replace Lewis as a judge in season 2 while Norton, Visage, Mattel and Williams would return.

Series overview

Season 1 (2021) 

The first season of Queen of the Universe premiered on December 2, 2021, on Paramount+. The season ran for six episodes and concluded on December 30, 2021. Ada Vox was the runner-up, and Grag Queen was the winner of the first season.

Season 2 (2023) 

The second season of Queen of the Universe is slated to premiere on June 2, 2023, on Paramount+.

Awards and nominations

See also 
 List of Paramount+ original programming
 List of reality television programs with LGBT cast members

References

External links 

 
2020s American LGBT-related television series
2020s American music television series
2020s American reality television series
2021 American television series debuts
Drag (clothing) television shows
Paramount+ original programming
Television series by World of Wonder (company)
Television shows shot in London